The 1972–73 saw Tottenham compete in the Football League First Division, the FA Cup the League Cup and the UEFA Cup.

Season summary
In the league Tottenham finished in 8th place. In FA Cup the club entered the competition in the third round with an away game against Margate which Tottenham won 6–0. In round four Tottenham were drawn against Derby County, with the first game being a draw it required a reply which went to White Hart Lane. In the match Derby came back from 3–1 down to win the match on 5–3 knocking Tottenham out of the competition. This season saw Tottenham win the League Cup for the second time in their history. They entered the competition in the second round and made it all the way to the final to face Norwich City. In the final Ralph Coates came off the bench to score the only goal in the game to win the trophy. This also allowed Tottenham to qualify to play in the 1973–74 UEFA Cup competition. In the UEFA Cup they reached the semi-finals where they faced Liverpool over the two legs, the first game Liverpool won 1-0 and the second game Tottenham won 2–1, leaving a scoreline of 2–2 aggregate. However Tottenham were knocked out on the away-goals rule and Liverpool went on the win the competition.

Squad

Preseason and friendlies
Before the season started Tottenham played three away games against Bournemouth, Aton Villa and Scottish club Celtic. Also during the season Spurs played a testimonial match against Dutch side Feyenoord, in honour of Jimmy Greaves which was played at Wembley.

Competitions

First Division

Matches

FA Cup

League Cup

UEFA Cup

Tottenham won on away goal rules

2–2 on aggregate; Liverpool won on away goals.

Appearances 
Sources: League and FA Cup statistics, Europe, UEFA.com ; League Cup, 11v11.com

Notes
 Attendance data compiled from: Tottenham Hotspur Official handbook season 2018–2019.

References 

Tottenham Hotspur F.C. seasons
English football clubs 1972–73 season